Jessie Urquhart (1890 – 12 April 1948) was an Australian journalist, novelist and short-story writer.

Early life 
Jessie Urquhart was born in Sydney in 1890, younger daughter of William (c.1861–1931) and Elizabeth Barsby Urquhart (née Gault) (c.1861–1916). Her father, who was a gaol administrator, had migrated from Scotland in 1884, while her mother was from Leicester, England.

Career 
As well as writing three novels, Urquhart wrote stories for The School Magazine published by the NSW Department of Education for primary school students, some of which had appeared previously in The Sydney Morning Herald. She also contributed short stories to The Australian Woman's Mirror, The Bulletin and The Australian Women's Weekly. During her years in England she reported on the London literary scene.

Urquhart was a member of the Society of Women Writers and acted as secretary from 1932 until her departure for England in 1934.

In 1935 Zora Cross wrote of Urquhart that "she will not, I think, do her best work until, like Alice Grant Rosman, she relinquishes journalism for fiction".

Personal life 
Urquhart died in a nursing home in St John's Wood, London on 12 April 1948. She was survived by her sister, Eliza Urquhart (1885–1968).

Works 

 Wayside, Angus & Robertson, 1919
 Maryplace: The Story of Three Women and Three Men, Nicholson & Watson, 1934
 Giving Amber Her Chance, Endeavour Press, 1934

References 

1890 births
1948 deaths
Australian women journalists
20th-century Australian women writers
20th-century Australian writers